Code Age may refer to:
Code Age, a multimedia series created by Square Enix.
Code Age Commanders, a PlayStation 2 video game 
Code Age Brawls, a mobile video game
Code Age Archives, a manga published by Gangan Comics